Several counties in the state of Michigan use a Mile Road System to name different roads and streets. The most commonly known system is that of Detroit, including 8 Mile Road, the dividing line between Detroit and its northern suburbs as well as Wayne County and Oakland, Macomb and Washtenaw counties.

Bay County
In Bay County, roads west of the Saginaw River are numbered with the river (or, north of the river, State Street) marking the origin.

 0 Mile—Saginaw River
 1 Mile—Euclid Avenue
 2 Mile—Two Mile Road
 3 Mile—Three Mile Road
 4 Mile—Four Mile Road
 5 Mile—Mackinaw Road
 6 Mile—Fraser Road
 7 Mile—Seven Mile Road
 8 Mile—Eight Mile Road
 9 Mile—Nine Mile Road
 10 Mile—Garfield Road
 11 Mile—Eleven Mile Road
 12 Mile—Carter Road
 13 Mile—Flajole Road
 14 Mile—Rockwell Road (Bay–Midland county line)

Calhoun County
Going east from the county line between Calhoun and Kalamazoo counties. Many of the roads are known by both their mile names and their traditional names.

 0 Mile—Calhoun–Kalamazoo county line
  Mile— Mile Road
 1 Mile—1 Mile Road, Renton Road
  Mile— Mile Road
 2 Mile—Stone Jug Road
  Mile— Mile Road
 3 Mile—Helmer Road
  Mile— Mile Road
 4 Mile—Sonoma Road
  Mile— Mile Road
 5 Mile—Capital Avenue
 6 Mile—Cotton Lake Road
  Mile— Mile Road
 7 Mile—7 Mile Road
  Mile—Beadle Lake Road
 8 Mile—Union City Road
  Mile—Woodlin Road
 9 Mile—9 Mile Road
  Mile— Mile Road, Wattles Road
 10 Mile—Cady Road
  Mile—Jessup Road
 11 Mile—Wheatfield Road
  Mile— Mile Road
 12 Mile—12 Mile Road
 13 Mile—13 Mile Road
 14 Mile—14 Mile Road
 15 Mile—15 Mile Road
 16 Mile—16 Mile Road
  Mile— Mile Road, Linden Street
 17 Mile—Kalamazoo Avenue, Old 27
  Mile—Marshall Avenue
 18 Mile—18 Mile Road
  Mile— Mile Road
 19 Mile—19 Mile Road
 20 Mile—20 Mile Road
 21 Mile—21 Mile Road
 22 Mile—22 Mile Road
  Mile— Mile Road
 23 Mile—23 Mile Road
 24 Mile—24 Mile Road
 25 Mile—25 Mile Road
 26 Mile—Starr Commonwealth Road
 27 Mile—27 Mile Road
 28 Mile—Duck Lake Road, Eaton Road
  Mile—Maple Street
 29 Mile—Clark Street
  Mile—Newburg Road
 30 Mile—Van Wert Road, Calhoun Road

Metropolitan Detroit

Ford Road (equivalent of 0 Mile Road, western city, suburbs)
Warren Ave (equivalent of 1 Mile Road, western city, suburbs)
Joy Road (equivalent of 2 Mile Road in Washtenaw and Wayne counties)
Plymouth Road (equivalent of 3 Mile Road, western city, suburbs)
Schoolcraft Road (equivalent of 4 Mile Road, western city, suburbs)
5 Mile Road—Fenkell Avenue (in Detroit)
6 Mile Road—McNichols Avenue (in Detroit)
7 Mile Road—No other name (Ends at the curve west of Kelly Rd.  Moross Avenue in Grosse Pointe is not a mile road)
 Mile Road—State Fair St. 
8 Mile Road—Baseline Road (old name), (Ends at Helen St. east of Harper in Grosse Pointe Woods, with a 1-block stretch running east from Greater Mack. Vernier Road is not a mile road as 8 Mile Road continues east from point where Vernier branches off)
 Mile Road—Toepfer (By alignment only.  1/2 mile road designation not used)
9 Mile Road—School Road (old name)
 Mile Road—Stephens Rd (By alignment only.  1/2 mile road designation not used)
10 Mile Road—Kern Road (old name)
 Mile Road—Frazho (By alignment only.  1/2 mile road designation not used)
11 Mile Road—Townhall Road (old name)
 Mile Road—Catalpa Drive (West of N. Main Street) Gardenia Ave (East of N. Main Street) (By alignment only.  1/2 mile road designation not used)
12 Mile Road—Champagne Road (old name)
 Mile Road—Common Rd. (By alignment only.  1/2 mile road designation not used)
13 Mile Road—Chicago Road (old name) Canfield Road in Roseville, Couchez Road in St. Clair Shores (old names)
 Mile Road—Masonic Blvd. (By alignment only.  1/2 mile road designation not used)
14 Mile Road—Townline Road (old name)
 Mile Road—Quinn Rd. (By alignment only.  1/2 mile road designation not used)
15 Mile Road—Wolf Road (old name, Macomb County), Maple Road (Oakland County)
16 Mile Road—Metropolitan Parkway (Macomb County), Big Beaver Road, Quarton Road, Walnut Lake Road (Oakland County) Nunneley Road in Clinton Township (old name)
 Mile Road—(In Sterling Heights) Lone Pine Road (Oakland County)
17 Mile Road—Wattles Road (Oakland County)
  Mile Road—(In Sterling Heights)
18 Mile Road—Long Lake Road (Oakland County)
 Mile Road—(In Sterling Heights)
19 Mile Road—Square Lake Road (Oakland County)
 Mile Road—(In Sterling Heights)
20 Mile Road—Hall Road (Macomb County), South Boulevard (Oakland County)
21 Mile Road—Shoemaker Road (old name, Macomb County), Auburn Road (Oakland County)
22 Mile Road—Waldenburg Road (old name, Macomb County), Hamlin Road, Featherstone Road (Oakland County)
23 Mile Road—Telegraph Road, Old Telegraph Road, Whiskey Road, Coldwater Road, New Baltimore Highway, Yates Road (old names, Macomb County), Avon Road (Oakland County)
24 Mile Road—Cemetery Road, French Road (old names, Macomb County), Disco Road (old name, Oakland County), Parkdale Road, Walton Boulevard (Oakland County)
25 Mile Road—Arnold Road, Runyon Road (old names, Macomb County), Runyon Road, Tienken Road (Oakland County)
26 Mile Road—Town Line Road, Marine City Highway (old names, Macomb County), Mead Road, Dutton Road, Brown Road (Oakland County)
27 Mile Road—Davis Road (old name, Macomb County), Silverbell Road (Oakland County)
28 Mile Road—Gass Road (old name, Macomb County), Gunn Road, Waldon Road (Oakland County)
29 Mile Road—Knight Road (old name, Macomb County), Buell Road (Oakland County)
30 Mile Road—Sikes Road (old name, Macomb County), Parks Road, Stoney Creek Road, Clarkston Road (Oakland County)
31 Mile Road—Hart Road (old name, Macomb County), Predmore Road (Oakland County)
32 Mile Road—Division Road in Richmond; Fred Moore Highway, east of Richmond, Macomb County, Romeo Road (Oakland County)
33 Mile Road—Schooley Road (old name, Macomb County), Brewer Road, Drahner Road (Oakland County)
34 Mile Road—Woodbeck Road (old name, Macomb County), Mack Road, Lakeville Road (Oakland County)
35 Mile Road—School Road (old name, Macomb County), Frick Road (Oakland County)
36 Mile Road—Dewey Road (old name, Macomb County), Noble Road (Oakland County)
37 Mile Road—315th Street (old name, Macomb County), Gerst Road, Oakwood Road (Oakland County)
38 Mile Road-Boardman Street (old name, Macomb County), Davidson Lake Road (Oakland County)

Grand Traverse County
In Grand Traverse County, the mile roads are numbered from the location of the Boardman River and the ghost town of Keystone, named after its location at an important point on the river. 
 0 Mile—Keystone Road, Boardman River
 1 Mile—Garfield Avenue, Garfield Road
 2 Mile—Town Line Road (former name)
 3 Mile—Three Mile Road
 4 Mile—Four Mile Road
 5 Mile—Five Mile Road
 6 Mile—Six Mile Road, Haaland Road
7 Mile—Lautner Road
8 Mile—Bates Road 
9 Mile
10 Mile—Williamsburg Road

Kent County
Fulton Street is the north–south dividing line of the city of Grand Rapids.  But since Fulton Street is on a half-section line, Michigan Street is the baseline in Kent County, not Fulton Street.
 0 Mile—Michigan Street
 1 Mile—Leonard Street
 2 Mile—Knapp Street (a separate 2 Mile Road exists east of the Grand River, where Knapp curves north to what would theoretically be  Mile Road)
 3–21 Mile—3–21 Mile roads
 22 Mile—22 Mile Road (Kent–Montcalm and Kent–Newaygo county lines)

Manistee County 
In Manistee County, roads are numbered north from the village of Eastlake

 0 Mile—M-55
 1 Mile—Pine Creek Road
 2 Mile—Guenthardt Road
 3 Mile—Becker Road, River Road
 4 Mile
 5 Mile—River Road
 6 Mile—Coates Highway
 7 Mile—Kerry Road
 8 Mile—8 Mile Road
 9 Mile—9 Mile Road
 10 Mile—Maidens Road
 11 Mile—11 Mile Road
 12 Mile—Potter Road
 13 Mile—13 Mile Road
 14 Mile
 15 Mile—Alkire Road
 16 Mile—Lumley Road
 17 Mile—Glovers Lake Road
 18 Mile—Manke Road, Kernberger Road)
 19 Mile—County Line Road (Manistee-Benzie County Line)

Midland County
 0 Mile—Downtown Midland, marked by the line formed by Eastman Avenue and Poseyville Road—located exactly four miles west of Rockwell Road
 1 Mile—Patterson Road
 2 Mile—Vance Road
 3 Mile—Sandow Road
 4 Mile—Homer Road
 5 Mile—Five Mile Road
 6 Mile—Meridian Road
 7 Mile—Seven Mile Road
 8 Mile—Eight Mile Road
 9 Mile—Nine Mile Road
 10 Mile—Ten Mile Road
 11 Mile—Eleven Mile Road
 12 Mile—Castor Road
 13 Mile—Magrudder Road
 14 Mile—Alamando Road
 15 Mile—Geneva Road
 16 Mile—Lewis Road
 17 Mile—Coleman Road
 18 Mile—County Line Road (Midland–Isabella county line)

External links
https://web.archive.org/web/20140118052927/http://www.macombhistory.org/documents/MileRoadnamesdocument-01-18-11_001.pdf
Michigan Department of Transportation
Michigan Highways
Michigan Highway Ends

County roads in Michigan